"All I See" is a song by Kylie Minogue.

All I See may also refer to:

 "All I See" (Christopher Williams song), 1992
 "All I See" (A+ song), 1996

 "All I See", a song by Everyday People from the album You Wash... I'll Dry, 1990
 "All I See", a song by Presence from the album Inside, 1993
 "All I See", a song by Dido from the album Girl Who Got Away, 2013